Zhang Yang (died 198), courtesy name Zhishu, was a Chinese politician and warlord who lived during the late Eastern Han dynasty of China. Originally from Yunzhong Commandery (雲中郡; northern Shanxi) in the north, he eventually became the de facto ruler of Henei Commandery (河內郡; northern Henan). Although threatened by powerful warlords such as Cao Cao and Yuan Shao, Zhang Yang still provided refuge for Emperor Xian of Han numerous times, eventually attaining the rank of Grand Marshal (大司馬).

Early life
Zhang Yang was known for his bravery and fighting skill so served as Assistant Officer for Military Affairs in his native Bing Province (present-day Shanxi). When Emperor Ling created his private Western Garden army,  the Bing inspector Ding Yuan sent Zhang Yang to serve as a Major on the staff of the eunuch commander Jian Shuo. Following the Emperor's death, Jian Shuo lost a political struggle with imperial-in-law and General in Chief He Jin and was killed. Zhang Yang was then sent by He Jin back to his home to raise troops, as part of He Jin's failed efforts to pressure his eunuch opponents into resigning. Zhang Yang raised over a thousand men then focused on fighting bandits in Shangdang Commandery (上黨郡; in southwestern Hebei), perhaps hoping to recruit them.

As a warlord
With He Jin's death and the rise of Dong Zhuo plunging the land into civil war, Zhang Yang attempted to seize Shangdang Commandery for himself, but was unable to do so so plundered the surrounding counties with his army growing into the several thousands. When Yuan Shao led his forces to Henei for the camapign against Dong Zhuo, Zhang Yang and the Xiongnu Shanyu claimant Yufuluo joined him, camping at the Zhang river, though there were doubts about their loyalty with Han Fu officer Zhao Fu using that distrust and failure to use them has part of his urging Han Fu to hold on against Yuan Shao. 

In 191 Yufuluo revolted and sought Zhang Yang's support; Zhang Yang's refusal resulted in his kidnapping and his forces absorbed in Yufuluo's. Yuan Shao dispatched Qu Yi after them and to the south of Ye they were defeated. Yufuluo and Zhang Yang went to Liyang where they defeated General on the Liao Geng Zhi and established a base at the important salient. Dong Zhuo appointed Zhang Yang as the Administrator of Henei Commandery and General Who Establishes Righteousness with Zhang Yang soon escaping from Yufuluo's grasp and establishing himself at Yewang, north-east across the Yellow River.

In 192, Zhang Yang took in his friend and Dong Zhuo's assassin Lü Bu, who was wanted by Dong Zhuo's successor Li Jue. Lü Bu left for Yuan Shao, putting further distance from Li Jue and the rewards offered, not long after, only to return in 193. With Li Jue still pressing for his death, Lü Bu suggested it would be wrong for Zhang Yang to kill a fellow man of Bing but Zhang Yang could get reward by seeming to offer Lü Bu to Li Jue.  Zhang Yang feigned to betray Lü Bu in public but remained friendly and secretly protected him. Nevertheless, Lü Bu's position of refuge was uncertain so he left for Zhang Miao not long after.

In 194, Cao Cao sought to reach out to the Han court to legitimize his position in Yan province but Zhang Yang was between Cao Cao and the court in Chang'an. Zhang Yang's adviser Dong Zhao persuaded Zhang Yang it would be wiser to earn favour with Cao Cao and not only let the envoy through to the court but to also wrote in backing Cao Cao. Sending an envoy to Cao Cao, in exchange Cao Cao sent gifts of dogs, horses, silk and gold.

In 195, the general Dong Cheng brought Emperor Xian to Henei Commandery in an attempt to avoid the forces of Li Jue and Guo Si. Zhang Yang's hospitality earned him the appointment of General Who Pacifies the State (安國將軍) and the peerage "Marquis of Jinyang". Over the course of the year, Zhang Yang recommended Emperor Xian return to the capital Luoyang, but this was rejected by the emperor's entourage. Finally, in 196, Zhang Yang escorted Emperor Xian back to Luoyang, and also oversaw the reconstruction of the imperial palace (which was burnt down by Dong Zhuo in 191). Unlike most other warlords, who kept the emperor for political benefit, Zhang Yang returned to Henei Commandery after the completion of his mission. For his deeds he was promoted to Grand Marshal.

In 198, as Cao Cao was preparing to campaign against Lü Bu, Zhang Yang made preparations to assist the latter. These preparations were cut short, however, after he was assassinated by his subordinate Yang Chou (楊醜), who then attempted to surrender to Cao Cao only to be killed by Sui Gu (眭固), who then surrendered to Yuan Shao.

The Yingxiong Ji (英雄記) states that Zhang Yang was "of mild and merciful temperament, and under him there were no harsh punishments."

See also
 Lists of people of the Three Kingdoms

References

 Chen, Shou (3rd century). Records of the Three Kingdoms (Sanguozhi).
 Fan, Ye (5th century). Book of the Later Han (Houhanshu).
 Pei, Songzhi (5th century). Annotations to Records of the Three Kingdoms (Sanguozhi zhu).

2nd-century births
198 deaths
Assassinated Chinese politicians
Han dynasty politicians from Shanxi
Han dynasty warlords
People from North China